Donald L. Horowitz (born 1939) is James B. Duke Professor of Law and Political Science at Duke Law School and Duke University in Durham, North Carolina, United States.

He earned his PhD from Harvard University in 1968 and also holds degrees from Syracuse University. He is a specialist in the study of ethnic conflict and author of the books Ethnic Groups in Conflict (University of California Press, 1985), A Democratic South Africa? Constitutional Engineering in a Divided Society (University of California Press, 1991), The Deadly Ethnic Riot (University of California Press, 2001) and Constitutional Change and Democracy in Indonesia (Cambridge University Press, 2013). Writing about Ethnic Groups in Conflict, political scientist Ashutosh Varshney states that it "was a seminal text", and that: "For the first time in scholarly history, a book on ethnic conflict covered a whole variety of topics, ranging from concepts and definitions to those spheres of institutional politics (party politics, military politics, affirmative action) in which the power of ethnicity had become obvious and could no longer be ignored".

Horowitz has acted as a consultant on the problems of divided societies and on policies to reduce ethnic conflict in  locations including Russia, Romania, Nigeria, Tatarstan and Northern Ireland. In 2006, he was appointed to Secretary of State's Advisory Committee on Democracy Promotion.

Prior to his appointment at Duke, Horowitz was employed as a lawyer at the Department of Justice and undertook research at the Harvard Center for International Affairs, the Woodrow Wilson Center, the Brookings Institution and the Smithsonian Institution. He is a fellow of the American Academy of Arts and Sciences. He is awarded a 2013 Berlin Prize Fellowship at the American Academy in Berlin.

References

External links
Donald Horowitz's official homepage at Duke University

Duke University faculty
Duke University School of Law faculty
Harvard University alumni
Living people
American political scientists
Jewish American social scientists
Syracuse University alumni
1939 births
Scholars of nationalism
Academic staff of Reichman University
Academic staff of Central European University
Reagan-Fascell Democracy Fellows